The Arthur J. Will Memorial Fountain is located in Los Angeles' Grand Park, in the U.S. state of California.

The fountain was removed during the 2010s.

References

External links 

 

Civic Center, Los Angeles
Fountains in California